Javier Díaz González (born September 13, 1979) is a Mexican former swimmer, who specialized in freestyle and individual medley events. He is a two-time Olympian (2000 and 2004), and a former Mexican record holder in the 50, 100, and 200 m freestyle. Diaz also attended Purdue University in West Lafayette, Indiana, where he majored in economics, and played for the Purdue Boilermakers.

Diaz made his Olympic debut as a 21-year-old native from Mexico at the 2000 Summer Olympics in Sydney. He failed to reach the top 16 in any of his individual events, finishing thirtieth in the 200 m freestyle (1:53.30), and thirty-seventh in the  200 m individual medley (2:07.28).

At the 2004 Summer Olympics in Athens, Diaz teamed up with Joshua Ilika Brenner, Alejandro Siqueiros, and Leonardo Salinas Saldana in the men's 4 × 200 m freestyle relay. Swimming the third leg, Diaz recorded a split of 1:53.34, and the Mexicans rounded out an eight-team field to last place and fifteenth overall in a new national record of 7:29.54.

Shortly after his second Olympics, Diaz retired from swimming to work as a sports analyst for Televisa Deportes Network. He also became a network's swimming commentator for the 2011 Pan American Games in Guadalajara, and eventually, for the 2012 Summer Olympics in London.

References

External links
Player Bio – Purdue Boilermakers

1979 births
Living people
Mexican male medley swimmers
Olympic swimmers of Mexico
Swimmers at the 1999 Pan American Games
Swimmers at the 2000 Summer Olympics
Swimmers at the 2004 Summer Olympics
Mexican male freestyle swimmers
Pan American Games competitors for Mexico
Purdue Boilermakers men's swimmers
Sportspeople from Saltillo